The Aurora Goldeneye is a reconnaissance UAV under development in the United States during the first decade of the 21st century. It is a ducted fan design in roughly the same class as the Sikorsky Cypher II. This UAV was built under a DARPA contract and is apparently focused on covert or special forces operations.

The Goldeneye is a "tail-sitter" or "pogo" machine that takes off and lands straight up. It is a stumpy-looking machine with four tailfins, each with landing gear on the fintip, and a wing that pivots, allowing it to be aligned with the aircraft centerline in cruise flight and at a right angle to the centerline in hover flight.

The Goldeneye is built of graphite and fiberglass composites, and has a low radar, infrared, and acoustic signature. It is powered by a 28 kW (38 hp) Wankel-rotary engine from AV Engines Ltd in the UK. It has an autonomous flight control system with GPS-INS navigation.

The Goldeneye can carry a small electo-optic sensor turret or other payload and features a radio datalink. Apparently the DARPA specification mysteriously required that it be able to carry "two coke-can size payloads" that were not described further. Aurora is working on a half-scale version of the Goldeneye for commercial sales.

Specifications (Goldeneye 100)

References

This article contains material that originally came from the web article Unmanned Aerial Vehicles by Greg Goebel, which exists in the Public Domain.

2000s United States military reconnaissance aircraft
Unmanned aerial vehicles of the United States
Tailsitter aircraft